Mary Ann McCann (1890 – 1966) was an Irish-born American woman who was awarded the Silver Lifesaving Medal, for rescuing passengers, including up to nine children, from the 1904 PS General Slocum steamboat fire in New York City.

Early life
Mary McCann immigrated to the United States from Athlone in Ireland, arriving in Ellis Island on April 24, 1904.

Sudden fame
In June 1904, McCann was a teenager recovering from measles and scarlet fever, when she witnessed the fire aboard the PS General Slocum from the hospital on North Brother Island. McCann, reportedly a strong swimmer, waded into the East River and helped passengers to safety, including as many as nine children. While hospitalized with the injuries she sustained that night, McCann also caught diphtheria.

Aftermath
Her role in the rescue of Slocum survivors was publicized nationally, often with editorial commentary on her immigrant status. "And learned men talk of the danger of immigration to this country!" marveled the Spokane Press. "May Ireland send us many another Mary McCann." McCann received hundreds of proposals of marriage by mail, from men who read of her feat. More helpfully, lawyer Francis Patrick Garvan offered McCann housing and funds for her education, after her testimony at the coroner's inquest.

Although she was recognized for her heroism by the coroner's investigation and by the Volunteer Life Saving Society, she was "overlooked" by the Carnegie Hero Fund Commission in 1906. In 1908, McCann was a nurse in training, and the only woman among the nine people awarded silver Lifesaving Medals by the United States Congress, for courageous action on the night of the disaster. She received the medal in person a few months later, when it was presented to her by the Speaker of the House, Joseph Gurney Cannon.

McCann found work as a cashier later in 1904. She attended the Florence Crittenton Training School in Washington, D. C. She lived at the Florence Crittenton Mission Home in New York for a time as a young woman.

Later years
Mary McCann married David A. M. Perlman in 1916. They had four daughters. She died in May 1966, at Barnegat Memorial Hospital in Paterson, New Jersey.

References

1890 births
1966 deaths
People from Athlone
Irish emigrants to the United States (before 1923)
People from New York City